Point Break Live! is a parody by Jaime Keeling of the 1991 Keanu Reeves, Patrick Swayze action crime movie Point Break.
Sometimes credited as the first-ever "reality-play",
each performance features a new, unrehearsed actor in the protagonist role of Johnny Utah, reading their lines from cue-cards delivered by a production assistant.

How it works 
At the start of the show, audience members who wish to play Johnny Utah are called on stage and put through a quick faux-audition. The winner is then selected by audience Applause-o-meter. A cue card assistant (cast member) leads Utah around the stage throughout the play and shows him or her the lines on laminated cards. Some have said that the winner is frequently a "ringer," because the person chosen is often a good actor and always fits into the wetsuit. The play is an over-the-top, action-packed comedy.

History 
The play premiered in a sold-out 2-month run co-directed by Jaime Keeling and Jamie Hook at Seattle's Northwest Film Forum
and has since toured throughout the country, including extended runs at the Bryant-Lake Bowl in Minneapolis
and Galapagos Art Space in Brooklyn, New York. 
The show played recently at the La Tea Theater in Manhattan.  It previously played at Charlie O's Lounge in the Hotel Alexandria in downtown Los Angeles,
where much of the movie took place, and premiered on October 1, 2008, at the V Theater at the Miracle Mile Shops in Las Vegas.
Producer-Director Eve Hars brought the show to  Chicago's New Rock Theater, where it ran from March to October 2010, and reopened for a short spring run in 2011.

The show's longest run to date is in LA/Hollywood, where it opened in 2007 and closed June 25, 2016.

Productions 
Point Break Live! was performed at:
 The Dragonfly in Hollywood
 The Theatre Guild of Ancon (Community Theatre in English) in Panama City, Panama - June 20 – 29, 2013
 The Alley Theater in Louisville, Kentucky.

The San Francisco production ran sequentially across 4 different venues between April 11, 2008, and June 3, 2016. (Last tickets: https://archive.org/details/DNALOUNGE-2016-06-03) 
All but 2 of its performances sold out. During this period, the show closed out its first venue (The Xenodrome) and third venue (The Metreon) due to impending reconstruction projects. The final night was almost cancelled due to a bomb threat at the theater. (https://web.archive.org/web/20160615020643/http://sfist.com/2016/06/03/sfpd_evacuating_offices_rerouting_m.php)

Cast 
 Notable figures who have played Johnny Utah in the production include: Lori Petty (who played Utah's girlfriend Tyler Endicott in the movie), Justin Pierre from the band Motion City Soundtrack, Juli Crockett, Andre Ethier (outfielder for the LA Dodgers), and stand-up comedian Jake Weisman.
 Gary Busey made a special appearance on stage at the Dragonfly production. (See video.)
 Patrick O'Sullivan from the ABC sitcom "The Neighbors" played Angelo Pappas/Gary Busey in the show from 2011 to 2013.
 Other celebrity attendees include Kirsten Dunst and Justin Long, writer Peter Iliff, and director Kathryn Bigelow.

Awards
 Mayor Gavin Newsom declared April 11, 2008 "Point Break Live! Day" in San Francisco.
 Point Break Live! hit the #1 spot on E! Daily 10 in 2008.
 ABC News Nightline aired a segment about Point Break Live! in 2009.
 WGN aired a segment of Chicago's Best with Brittney Payton, daughter of Walter Payton interviewing the cast

References

External links
 Ticket info: TheaterMania
 Video: Scenes from Point Break LIVE! at V Theater at Planet Hollywood, Las Vegas
 Review: Yo, Johnny! See you in the next life!
 On being a corpse: 15 minutes of blood, guns and fame at Point Break Live!

2003 plays
2000s debut plays
American plays
Comedy plays
Plays based on films
Off-Broadway plays